The 2011 United States motorcycle Grand Prix was the tenth round of the 2011 Grand Prix motorcycle racing season. It took place on the weekend of July 22–24, 2011 at Laguna Seca. As in previous years, only the MotoGP class raced at Laguna Seca, with the domestic Superbike, Sportbike, and Supersport championships joining the MotoGP class instead of the Moto2 and 125cc classes.

MotoGP classification

Championship standings after the race (MotoGP)
Below are the standings for the top five riders and constructors after round ten has concluded.

Riders' Championship standings

Constructors' Championship standings

 Note: Only the top five positions are included for both sets of standings.

References

United States motorcycle Grand Prix
United States
United States Motorcycle Grand Prix
United States Motorcycle Grand Prix
United States motorcycle Grand Prix